The Denfeld neighborhood is located within the West Duluth district of Duluth, Minnesota, United States.  It consists mostly of closely spaced single-family residential homes, although a fair number of such houses have an area within the domicile registered as a rental unit.  There are also a number of stores and businesses in the neighborhood concentrated along Grand Avenue.

 The Denfeld neighborhood, according to the city's map, is bounded by West 8th Street until Central Avenue; by Central Avenue until its intersection with Grand Avenue; Grand Avenue, until it crosses 46th Avenue West; and a divide near the Interstate 35 freeway until the railroad tracks near Carlton Street, the classic dividing-point between West Duluth and rival neighborhood Lincoln Park.

Duluth Denfeld High School serves most of West Duluth; six neighborhoods farther to the west; and both Lincoln Park and Piedmont Heights to the east; and is an architectural icon of the neighborhood.

Adjacent neighborhoods
Cody (north, west)
Lincoln Park (east)
Oneota (south)
Spirit Valley (south, west)

See also
40th Avenue West – County Road 91

References

External links
City of Duluth website
City map of neighborhoods (PDF)
Duluth Denfeld High School website

Duluth–Superior metropolitan area
Neighborhoods in Duluth, Minnesota